During the 2016–17 season, AFC Ajax participated in the Eredivisie, the KNVB Cup, the UEFA Champions League and the UEFA Europa League.The first training took place on 25 June 2016. The traditional AFC Ajax Open Day was held on 29 July 2016.

Player statistics 
Appearances for competitive matches only

|-
|colspan="14"|Players sold or loaned out after the start of the season:

|-
|}
As of 24 May 2017

Team statistics

2016–17 Eredivisie standings

Points by match day

Total points by match day

Standing by match day

Goals by match day

Topscorers

Placements

 Davinson Sánchez was voted Player of the year by the supporters of AFC Ajax.
 Kasper Dolberg was voted Talent of the year by the supporters of AFC Ajax.
 Peter Bosz was nominated for the Rinus Michels Award 2017 in the category: Best Trainer/Coach in Professional Football.
 Kasper Dolberg was voted Danish Talent of the Year: 2017 by the Danish Football Association.
 Matthijs de Ligt, Bertrand Traoré and Amin Younes were selected for the 2017 UEFA Europa League squad of the season by the UEFA Technical Observers.

Competitions
All times are in CEST

Eredivisie

League table

Matches

KNVB Cup

UEFA Champions League

Third qualifying round

Play-off round

UEFA Europa League

Group stage

Round of 32

Round of 16

Quarter-finals

Semi-final

Final

Friendlies

Transfers for 2016–17

Summer transfer window
For a list of all Dutch football transfers in the summer window (1 July 2016 to 31 August 2016) please see List of Dutch football transfers summer 2016.

Arrivals 
 The following players moved to AFC Ajax.

Departures 
 The following players moved from AFC Ajax.

Winter transfer window 
For a list of all Dutch football transfers in the winter window (1 January 2017 to 1 February 2017) please see List of Dutch football transfers winter 2016–17.

Arrivals 
 The following players moved to AFC Ajax.

Departures 
 The following players moved from AFC Ajax.

References

Ajax
AFC Ajax seasons
Ajax
Ajax